James Glynn Gregory (May 12, 1843 – February 1, 1932) was Surgeon General of Connecticut from 1881 to 1882. He served as Warden of the Borough of Norwalk, Connecticut, from 1888 to 1889, and as a member of the Connecticut House of Representatives in 1879.

He was born in Norwalk, Connecticut, on May 12, 1843, the son of Ira Gregory and Frances Augusta Gregory. He was the fourth great-grandson of John Gregory, one of the founding settlers of Norwalk. His daughter was American suffragette Alyse Gregory.

He graduated from Yale in 1865. He then went to the New York College of Physicians and Surgeons. He worked for two years at the Brooklyn City Hospital.

In 1870, he returned to Norwalk. He was elected to the Connecticut House of Representatives in 1879. He was surgeon general of Connecticut from 1881 to 1882. He served as a burgess of the Borough of Norwalk, and as warden from 1888 to 1889.

References 

1843 births
1932 deaths
Physicians from Connecticut
New York College of Physicians and Surgeons alumni
Connecticut city council members
Mayors of Norwalk, Connecticut
Republican Party members of the Connecticut House of Representatives
Yale College alumni